Pistone is an Italian surname. Notable people with the surname include:
 Alessandro Pistone (born 1975), Italian footballer
 Anita Pistone (born 1976), Italian sprinter
 Chase Pistone (born 1983), American racing driver
 Danièle Pistone (born 1946), French musicologist and professor
 Joseph D. Pistone (born 1939), American FBI agent and writer
 Pete Pistone (born 1964), American motorsports journalist and commentator
 Tom Pistone (born 1929), American racing driver

Italian-language surnames